The Baloch National Movement is a Baloch nationalist political organization which was led by Ghulam Mohammed Baloch, who served as the organizations's president before his murder in April 2009.

History 
In 1987, the educated Baloch youth created Baloch National Youth Movement, which aimed at raising awareness about Balochistan's independence. Its leader Fida Ahmed was killed in 1988, allegedly on the orders of Pakistan military.

After his murder, the most senior leaders of the group—Dr Malik (incumbent Chief Minister of Balochistan and Dr Hai Baloch) decided to take part in Pakistan's parliamentary politics. They changed the party's name to Balochistan National Movement. The party soon became the strongest in Balochistan and won several seats in the Balochistan Assembly and Pakistan's National Assembly. The party leaders also changed their demand from Balochistan's independence to provincial autonomy within Pakistan. After their first tenure in government, reports of corruption and incompetence within started emerging in the media and inside circles.
However, their students’ wing, the Baloch Students Organization, led by Ghulam Mohammad Baloch, was still demanding independence from Pakistan. After 1992, Ghulam Mohammed Baloch completed his time in the BSO and joined the Balochistan National Movement.
He created a pressure group within the party to end participation in the “corrupt” parliamentary politics and revert to the basic mission of the party which was to mobilize the Baloch people for a movement for an independent Balochistan. His influence grew fast within the party and he became the Senior Vice President.

In 2004, his group succeeded in including the demand of independence in the party's manifesto and renamed the party as the Baloch National Movement. Dr Malik Baloch and his like-minded leaders joined another party and renamed their group as the National Party, removing the word Balochistan from the name.

Ghulam Mohammad Baloch led the Baloch National Movement till 2009 when he was murdered by Pakistan military. During his six years’ tenure as president of the party, he made the BNM as the biggest mass party in Balochistan and people started raising the slogan of Balochistan's freedom once again.

Ghulam Mohammed had such respect among Baloch separatist militants that he was able to persuade them to release UNHCR official John Solecki. The United Nations and the US embassy in Pakistan condemned his murder and appreciated him for his efforts for humanitarian causes.

Currently, the party is being led by Khalil Baloch. Hundreds of BNM's workers have been either killed or abducted by Pakistan military.

Zrumbesh is part of a multi language media network. Working under Zrumbesh Broadcasting corporation which is an autonomous body under Baloch National Movement (BNM).

References

Baloch nationalist organizations
Balochistan
Nationalist organizations